The Buzău Mountains are a set of six mountains ranges in Romania which are part of the Curvature Carpathians region of the Outer Eastern Carpathians.

These six mountain ranges are as follows: 

. 
The Penteleu and Ivănețu Massifs are to the east, and border the Vrancea Mountains. Finally, the Tătaru Mountains are to the west, abutting the Ciucaș Mountains.

The highest peaks in the Buzău Mountains are:
 , Penteleu Massif,   
 , Siriu Massif, 
 Tătaru Mare, Tătaru Mountains, 
 Vârful lui Crai, Tătaru Mountains, 
 Podu Calului Peak, Podu Calului Massif, 
 , Ivănețu Massif, . 

These mountains are crossed by the Buzău Pass, which follows the Buzău River and connects Brașov with Buzău. Lake Siriu is an artificial dam lake on the river, at the southern end of the pass.

The surrounding area offers vineyards, camping and hiking as visitor attractions. Rockfalls, mudslides and other seismic activity are not uncommon in the area.

Gallery

External links 
 online description of the region (in Romanian)
 tourist-oriented online article on Buzău Mountains

Mountain ranges of Romania
Mountain ranges of the Eastern Carpathians